James Frederick Skinner Gordon (1821–1904) was a Scottish antiquary and a minister in the Scottish Episcopal Church.

Life 
James Frederick Skinner Gordon, born at Keith, Banffshire, in 1821, claimed descent from the Gordons of Glenbucket, in Strathdon. Educated at Keith School and then at Madras College, St. Andrews, he gained, when fifteen years of age, the Grant bursary at St. Andrews University, and graduated there with distinction in 1840, proceeding M.A. in 1842. Appointed organising master in the (Episcopal) national schools at Edinburgh, he was ordained deacon in the Scottish Episcopal Church in 1843 and priest the next year. After a first curacy to the Bishop of Moray (Dr. Low) at Pittenweem, Fifeshire, he removed in 1843 to Forres as curate to Alexander Ewing, afterwards Bishop of Argyll and the Isles at Forres (1843–4). His experiences at Pittenweem are narrated in his Scotichronicon. 

In 1844 he was translated to the charge of St. Andrew's Episcopal Church, Glasgow, the oldest post-Reformation church in Scotland, and there he remained till 1890, when he retired owing to advancing years. At Glasgow he devoted much energy to the development of Episcopacy, and raised funds wherewith to remodel and endow his church. He was a pioneer in effecting the removal of ruinous tenements and slums in the neighbourhood, thus initiating the movement which resulted in the Glasgow Improvement Act of 1866. His "High Church" tendencies sometimes led to friction in his own denomination; but his earnest philanthropic work brought him general admiration.

He was an enthusiastic Freemason, having been initiated as a student at St. Andrews in 1841, and he was the oldest member of the craft at his death. After resigning the charge of St. Andrew's Church in 1890 he lived in retirement at Beith, Ayrshire, and died there on 23 January 1904. He was interred with masonic honours in Beith cemetery.

Works 
Gordon led at the same time a strenuous literary life, closely studying the history of the Catholic and the Episcopal churches in Scotland, and the antiquities of Glasgow. His chief publication was The Ecclesiastical Chronicle for Scotland (4 volumes, Glasgow, 1867), which Alexander Hastie Millar calls "an elaborate and erudite work, which displayed much research"; the first two volumes, entitled Scotichronicon, contain a sketch of the pre-Reformation church, and an extended version of Keith's Catalogue of Scottish Bishops; the third and fourth volumes, entitled Monasticon, give the history of the Scottish monasteries, and biographies of the Roman Catholic bishops of the post-Reformation mission. 

Gordon also published (all at Glasgow): 

 Glasghu Facies (a history of Glasgow, written in a lively style), 1872.
 The Book of the Chronicles of Keith, Grange, Ruthven, Caimey, and Botriphnie, 1880.
 New edition of Lachlan Shaw's History of the Province of Moray, 1882.
 Zona, a Description of the Island, 1885.
 Vade Mecum to and through the Cathedral of St. Kentigem of Glasgow, 1894.

Gordon also contributed an article on the "Scottish Episcopal Church" to the Cyclopædia of Religious Denominations (London, 1853), and wrote on "Meteorology" to several encyclopaedias and journals. In 1857 he received the degree of D.D. from Hobart College, U.S.A.

References

Sources 

 
 Ockerbloom, John Mark, ed. "Gordon, James Frederick Skinner, 1821-1904". "Gordon, J. F. S. (James Frederick Skinner), 1821-1904". Online Books Page. Retrieved 2 October 2022.

Attribution:

Further reading 

 Glasgow Herald, 25 January 1904.
 Scottish Guardian, 6 February 1904.

1821 births
1904 deaths
19th-century antiquarians
19th-century Scottish Episcopalian priests
19th-century Scottish writers
Scottish antiquarians